The King of the Blues is an album by blues musician Lightnin' Hopkins recorded in Texas in late 1964 and released on the Pickwick/33 label. The album was also released as Let's Work Awhile on Blue Horizon in 1971.

Track listing
All compositions by Sam "Lightnin'" Hopkins
 "This Time We're Gonna Try" – 3:58
 "Christmas Time Is Coming" – 3:52
 "Come On Baby, Let's Work Awhile" – 3:13
 "The Jet" – 3:26
 "I Don't Need You Woman" – 3:50
 "I Wish I Was a Baby" – 3:36
 "The Crazy Song" – 3:06
 "Lightnin's Love" – 4:48
 "Take It If You Want To" – 2:35
 "How Have You Been?" – 4:06

Personnel
Lightnin' Hopkins – guitar, vocals

References

1965 albums
Lightnin' Hopkins albums
Pickwick Records albums